The Spencer Penrose Award is awarded yearly to the top coach in NCAA Division I men's ice hockey by the American Hockey Coaches Association.

The finalists for each year's award comprise the conference Coach of the Year winners from each Division I men's ice hockey conference, plus the coaches of the four Frozen Four teams.

Spencer Penrose was a philanthropist who helped construct The Broadmoor resort in Colorado Springs, Colorado, where the first ten college ice hockey championships were held.

Several coaches have won the award more than once but Len Ceglarski and George Gwozdecky are the only people to have done so for different teams. Mike Hastings is the only coach to win the award in consecutive seasons (As of 2022).

Award Winners

Winners by school

Multiple Wins

See also
Edward Jeremiah Award

References

NCAA Division I ice hockey